Frost & Granger was an American architectural partnership from 1898 to 1910 of brothers-in-law Charles Sumner Frost (1856–1931) and Alfred Hoyt Granger (1867–1939). Frost and Granger were known for their designs of train stations and terminals, including the now-demolished Chicago and North Western Terminal, in Chicago. The firm designed several residences in Hyde Park, Illinois, and many other buildings. Several of their buildings are listed on the U.S. National Register of Historic Places.

Works (attribution) include:
Chicago & North Western Station (1898), Wilmette, Illinois, demolished in the 1970s
Chicago & North Western Station (1898), Ravenswood, Illinois
Chicago & North Western Station (1899), Clybourn Junction, Illinois
Chicago and North Western Railway Passenger Depot (1899), 202 Dousman Street, Green Bay, Wisconsin (Frost & Granger), NRHP-listed
Chicago and North Western Railway station (1899), Western Avenue and Deer Path, Lake Forest, Illinois
Chicago and North Western Railway passenger station (1899), Highland Park, Illinois
Chicago, Milwaukee and St. Paul Railway Company Passenger Depot (1900), 127 S. Spring Street, Beaver Dam, Wisconsin (Frost & Granger), NRHP-listed,
Chicago and North Western Railway Passenger Depot (1901), West Main Street at Clark Avenue, Ames, Iowa
Racine Depot (1901), 1402 Liberty Street, Racine, Wisconsin (Frost & Granger), NRHP-listed
Rock Island Lines Passenger Station (1901), 3029 5th Avenue, Rock Island, Illinois (Frost & Granger), NRHP-listed
Chicago and North Western Railway Passenger Depot (1901), Mount Vernon, Iowa
Chicago and North Western Railway Passenger Depot (1901), Watertown, South Dakota
Chicago & North Western Station (1901), Odebolt, Iowa
Chicago and North Western Railway station (1901), Des Moines, Iowa
Chicago and North Western Railway Station (1901), Nevada, Iowa
LaSalle Street Station (1902), Chicago, demolished 1981
Chicago & Eastern Illinois and Lake Erie & Western Station (1902), Hoopeston, Illinois
Chicago and North Western Depot (1902), Oak Street NW., Sleepy Eye, Minnesota (Frost & Granger), NRHP-listed
Chicago, Milwaukee, St Paul & Pacific Station (1902), Wausau, Wisconsin
Chicago & North Western Station (1902), 2nd Street & Nebraska Street, Sioux City, IA, demolished in 1962.
 Chicago and North Western Depot (1902), 220 Lynn St, Baraboo, Wisconsin, NRHP-listed
West Madison Depot, Chicago, Milwaukee, and St. Paul Railway (1903), 640 W. Washington Avenue, Madison, Wisconsin (Frost & Granger), NRHP-listed
Chicago and North Western office building, 226 West Jackson Boulevard at Franklin Street, Chicago (1904)
Chicago & North Western Station (1904), Lake Bluff, Illinois
Hilton House Hotel (1904), Beloit, Wisconsin
Chicago and North Western Railway station at Kedzie Avenue (1904), Chicago, Illinois
Northern Trust Company Building, 50 South LaSalle Street, Chicago, (1905)
Chicago & North Western Station (1905), Valentine, Nebraska
Chicago & North Western Station (1902), Zion City, Illinois
Chicago & North Western Freight Station (1906), Omaha, Nebraska
Chicago and North Western Depot (1906), Railroad Street, Reedsburg, Wisconsin (Frost & Granger), NRHP-listed
Chicago and North Western Railway Station (1906), Lander, Wyoming
Chicago and North Western Railway Station (1906), Ishpeming, Michigan
Antigo Depot (1907), 522 Morse Street, Antigo, Wisconsin (Frost & Granger), NRHP-listed
Chicago and North Western Railway station (1907), Main Street east of 1st Street, Breda, Iowa, to standard plan "Combination Depot No. 2" drawn by Frost & Granger (1899)
Chicago & North Western Depot (1907), Norwood Park, Illinois
Chicago and North Western Railway station (1907), Norfolk, Nebraska
Chicago & North Western Station (1909), McHenry, Illinois
Chicago & North Western Station (1910), Madison, Wisconsin.
Chicago & North Western Station (1910), Harvard, Illinois
Three Chicago & North Western Interlocking Towers (1910), Chicago, Illinois
Chicago & North Western Station (1910), Evanston, Illinois
Chicago & North Western Station (1910), Aberdeen, South Dakota
Chicago & North Western Station (1910), Wheaton, Illinois
Chicago and North Western Railway station (1910), Braeside, Illinois
Chicago and North Western Terminal (1911), Chicago, demolished 1984
Chicago and North Western Railway Powerhouse (1911), 211 North Clinton St, Chicago
Chicago and Northwestern Depot (1914), U.S. 212, Redfield, South Dakota (Frost & Granger), NRHP-listed

Gallery

References

Architecture firms based in Illinois
American railway architects
Chicago and North Western Railway